Rouble Nagi (born 8 July 1980) is an Indian artist specialising in sculptures, art installations and paintings. She is the Founder of Rouble Nagi Art Foundation. She is also the founder of Rouble Nagi Design Studio. She has over 800 murals to her credit and has held over 150 exhibitions. She is a member of the India Design Council (IDC). She has taken up an initiative to start Mumbai beautification with ‘Art Installations’ in and around the city.  Her latest initiative named "Misaal Mumbai" is the first slum painting initiative in India, through which she has painted over 24000 houses to date. A project to paint houses in slums in Mumbai to give life to the slum and keep it clean and hygienic.  

Nagi was born in 1980 in Jammu & Kashmir, India. She did undergraduate studies in political science and later studied fine art at the Slade School of Fine Art in London. She has also studied European Art at Sotheby's London.

Rouble Nagi Art Foundation 
Rouble Nagi Art Foundation one of the social initiatives initiated by Rouble Nagi that runs Balwadis with art programs in Mumbai slums to initiate children to come to school. The foundation aims to transform the community through art and education.

It aims to organize Art camps for the underprivileged to give them a social platform for interaction with the society.
The foundation has received support from Bollywood actors, including  Salman Khan, Sohail Khan, Sonam Kapoor, Emraan Hashmi, Sushmita Sen and Zayed Khan.

Misaal Mumbai | Slum Painting 
“Misaal Mumbai” is another initiative Social Activist Rouble Nagi. It all began with Paint Dharavi in 2016 and now extended to Bandra West along with several sites in Mumbai and other parts of Maharashtra. The project in Bandra West consisted of the painting of over 285 houses in Jaffar Baba Colony, Mount Mary, Bandra West. Rouble Nagi and her team along with help from locals and residents painted and cleaned the slums in these areas. 

The slums of Mumbai are home to millions of people, however, these areas are often drab and dirty. Rouble Nagi through her initiatives, is slowly transforming the city's slums into giant works of art. Rouble Nagi initially visited slums in her hometown to provide art classes for the children, this inspired her to do more.

References

External links

Alumni of the Slade School of Fine Art
Artists from Jammu and Kashmir
Indian muralists
1980 births
Living people
21st-century Indian women artists
Women artists from Jammu and Kashmir
21st-century Indian painters
21st-century Indian sculptors
Indian women painters
Indian women sculptors
Women muralists